The 1978 Canadian Grand Prix was a Formula One motor race held on 8 October 1978 at Montreal. This was the 16th and final race of the 1978 World Championship of F1 Drivers and the International Cup for F1 Constructors. It was Ferrari Driver Gilles Villeneuve's first victory in Formula One.

Report

Background 
The Canadian Grand Prix had moved from the Mosport Park circuit near Toronto to the newly built Circuit Île Notre-Dame in Montreal. The event had moved because of track safety and organization problems with the hilly and scenic Mosport Park track. This circuit, made up entirely of public roads was located on a man-made island in the middle of the St. Lawrence Seaway which was the location of Expo '67.

Before the race, in pre-race interviews Mario Andretti noted that he thought that the circuit has been designed in favour of Gilles Villeneuve, a comment that was picked up by local press. Andretti responded to the comments on race day morning, stating that he is "not critical of the race organizers", but instead "critical of our own FOCA officials who were sent over here to approve the track".

Both championships were already sewn up (in favour of Andretti and Lotus), so this, the final round, was a dead rubber in the 1978 title chase. Before the race, Brabham announced that rising star Brazilian driver Nelson Piquet, who had raced earlier in the season with Ensign and BS Fabrications, would be joining them in a third car, alongside regular drivers Niki Lauda and John Watson. The only other change was that Riccardo Patrese returned to the Arrows cockpit after missing the previous race.

Practice and qualifying 
Poor weather and rain on Friday morning meant that the first practice session began 20 minutes later than scheduled. When the session did start, the two Ferrari drivers were fastest, Carlos Reutemann fastest with a lap of 2:02.600, ahead of teammate Villeneuve. The McLarens struggled in the weather, with Peter Windsor noting that neither car was able to find "decent traction".

The second practice session held on Friday was in damp weather conditions as the track dried, with Reutemann again fastest, with a lap of 1:57.900. Brabham struggled again, as they did in the first session, with Piquet crashing into the wall. Due to their poor Friday, neither car had qualified for the race by the end of Friday's running.

Wet weather greeted the teams again on Saturday morning for a 90-minute practice session, although conditions got better towards the end of that session, allowing Lauda to go fastest with a time of 1:51.700, Keke Rosberg, Andretti and Watson completing the top four.

The entry of 28 cars had to be trimmed to 22 before the race, and those who failed to qualify were, unusually, from six different teams. They were Clay Regazzoni of Shadow, Beppe Gabbiani of Surtees, Arturo Merzario in the car bearing his name, Héctor Rebaque in a privately run Lotus, Rolf Stommelen of Arrows and Michael Bleekemolen of ATS.

There were uncharacteristically bad performances from Reutemann, who took third in the championship with Ferrari, but could only qualify 11th, and the Tyrrells of Patrick Depailler and Didier Pironi, both also regular points scorers but down in 13th and 18th. Piquet was 14th on his debut for Brabham.

The top ten was just as interesting as the bottom six, as eight different cars were featured. Jacques Laffite was the lowest ranked of these, putting his Ligier 10th. World champion Andretti was also off the pace for Lotus, qualifying 9th. Hans-Joachim Stuck drove very well to put the other Shadow 8th, beating his more decorated teammate Regazzoni by over two and a half seconds. Brabham, one of only two teams to have two cars in the top 10 (the other was Lotus), had Watson and Lauda 4th and 7th. They were split by Alan Jones's Williams, a sign of continuing improvement for the team and their Australian driver, who had finished 2nd the last time out at Watkins Glen, and Emerson Fittipaldi, who dragged the uncompetitive Copersucar up to 6th.

Home favourite Villeneuve put the Ferrari 3rd, a good performance from the Canadian who had been outperformed by teammate Reutemann all season. He was beaten to 2nd by Jody Scheckter of Wolf, who had also been improving of late. However, pole was a surprise. Jean-Pierre Jarier, who had fallen out of favour with ATS earlier in the season and been dropped in favour of drivers such as Alberto Colombo, Hans Binder and Harald Ertl, had last been semi-competitive with Shadow back in 1975 and had been drafted in by Lotus to replace Ronnie Peterson after his tragic death at Monza two races previous, took pole by just 0.011 seconds from Scheckter. This was no surprise after the Frenchman had set the fastest race lap in his first appearance for the team at Watkins Glen, but was classified 15th due to running out of fuel when in 3rd place.

Race 

Jarier kept the lead from the start, but Jones had a magnificent start, jumping up from 5th to 2nd. This meant that Scheckter dropped to 3rd, Villeneuve to 4th and Watson down to 5th. Andretti had jumped up past Lauda and Stuck and was holding 6th. Fittipaldi was a casualty on the first lap, sliding off the track into the mud and retiring. Stuck joined him at the same spot a lap later.

There was more drama in the race on lap 6, particularly for the Brabham team. First, Lauda had a brake failure and was out. Shortly afterwards, Andretti attempted to pass Watson in the other Brabham, and the two made contact, dropping almost right to the back of the field. This allowed Patrick Depailler up to 5th and Reutemann in the other Ferrari into 6th. Three laps later, Watson had an accident of his own, and was out for good.

The next retirement was on lap 17, when Bobby Rahal in the second Wolf suffered fuel injection problems and reduced the field to 17 runners.

Jarier had opened up a lead of 20 seconds at this point, as Jones in second was holding up the faster cars of Scheckter and Villeneuve behind him. However, on lap 18 Scheckter found a way past, and Villeneuve followed him through a lap later. At the same time, Depailler was dropping down the order with technical issues, allowing Reutemann into 5th and Derek Daly in the Ensign up to 6th. Daly was passed by Riccardo Patrese not long afterwards.

A good few laps ensued for Ferrari, as on lap 25 the very fast Villeneuve fought his way to 2nd past Scheckter, who everyone knew was to be his teammate at Ferrari in 1979, as Reutemann who had signed for champions Lotus. On lap 27, current teammate Reutemann battled past the slow Jones into fourth. Jones also slipped behind Patrese two laps later.

Daly moved back up to 6th on lap 33 when Jones dropped back even further with his own technical problems, but the Irishman was under severe pressure from Didier Pironi in the other Tyrrell. Lap 38 saw another retirement, that of René Arnoux in the Surtees with oil pressure difficulties.

The recovering Depailler fought his way past first teammate Pironi and then Derek Daly to take back 6th place on laps 47 and 48, just when trouble was beginning for fellow Frenchman Jean-Pierre Jarier, leading the race for Lotus, which first became apparent when Jacques Laffite was able to unlap himself in the Ligier. Three laps later, Jarier was out with no oil pressure. This was tragic for the Frenchman, who was looking certain to take his first victory, but fantastic for the Canadian fans, whose hero Villeneuve now looked set to take his. This allowed Daly back into the points in 6th.

 World Champion James Hunt crashed out two laps later, an unhappy end to his last race for McLaren, with whom he had had so much success, as it was known that the following year he would move to Wolf to replace Scheckter. He was followed out of the race by Laffite's Ligier a lap later, who had transmission problems.

From then on, the order did not change, and Villeneuve came home to take his first Grand Prix victory in front of his own fans. He was followed home by his Ferrari teammate for the following year, Jody Scheckter (scoring the last ever podium and points for Walter Wolf Racing) and his current teammate Carlos Reutemann, 13 and 19 seconds behind respectively. Patrese took 4th in a solid and uneventful race, with Depailler's race to fifth anything but uneventful. Derek Daly came home sixth to secure his and Ensign's first ever points finish.

Post-race 
In a blog to mark 30 years since Villeneuve had died, Windsor noted that this race marked the beginning of a "new era", with the "era of chassis design over" and the era of "ground effect" arriving, despite the fact that the race was won by a car without ground effect (Ferrari 312T3) and that the first win by a ground effect car (Lotus 79) happened six months earlier.

Qualifying

Qualifying classification 

*Positions in red indicate entries that failed to qualify.

Race

Classification

Championship standings after the race 

Drivers' Championship standings

Constructors' Championship standings

Note: Only the top five positions are included for both sets of standings.

References 

Canadian Grand Prix
Canadian Grand Prix
Grand Prix
Canadian Grand Prix
Grand Prix